Massena Central High School is a four-year public high school located in Massena, New York for students in grades 9 through 12. It is one of five schools, and the only high school, in the Massena Central School District.

Notable alumni
 Zach Bogosian - Defenseman in the NHL for the Tampa Bay Lightning

References

External links
School district website

Public high schools in New York (state)
Schools in St. Lawrence County, New York